Sargento José Félix López is a district in the department of Concepción, Paraguay.

References 
 

Populated places in Concepción Department, Paraguay
Districts of Concepción Department, Paraguay